Giving You the Business premiered on Food Network on Thursday April 25 at 10pm Eastern Time. In this program hosted by former NBA player turned motivational speaker Walter Bond, a CEO from a major food chain, handpicks four standout employees and secretly puts them to a series of tests of outrageous skills. Hidden cameras capture every move of these four employees. In the end the strongest candidate wins the key to their own food franchise which is worth up to half a million dollars.

Food Network original programming